Jon Russell Hulburd (born November 11, 1959) is a Phoenix lawyer and small businessman. He was the 2010 Democratic nominee for the U.S. House of Representatives in Arizona's 3rd congressional district.

Early life, education and career
Hulburd was born in Tulsa, Oklahoma. At the age of 7, his family moved from Oklahoma to Washington state.
Upon graduation from high school in 1977, Hulburd enrolled in Colorado College in Colorado Springs. He spent his summers in Alaska, working as a longshoreman in a fish-processing facility. He graduated with a B.A. in Philosophy and Political Science.

After Colorado, he worked as a congressional staffer for Gary Hart while attending George Washington University's Elliott School of International Affairs in the evenings to earn his Masters in International Affairs
.

In 1984, Hulburd began law school in New York City. After law school, Hulburd practiced law in New York for a few years before moving to Arizona. Hulburd clerked for the Federal Court after passing the Arizona State Bar Exam and continued his legal career by joined the law firm Fennemore Craig, where he eventually became a partner. 
Hulburd later began a small import business that supplied handcrafted pottery to retailers in the United States. The business lasted for six years.

2010 U.S. House campaign

Hulburd is running for Arizona's 3rd congressional district against Republican nominee Ben Quayle, Libertarian nominee Michael Shoen, and Green Party nominee Leonard Clark.

He officially filed his candidacy on October 16, 2009.

On January 14, 2010 16-year incumbent John Shadegg announced his retirement at the end of his term, making the third district an open seat.

The 10 Republicans running in their party's primary were former Vice President Dan Quayle's son, Ben Quayle, Arizona State Legislators Pamela Gorman, Jim Waring and Sam Crump, former Paradise Valley Mayors, Vernon Parker and Ed Winkler, Bob Branch, Leann Hull, Steve Moak, and Paulina Morris.
The Republicans were involved in a nasty primary fight that involved numerous attack mailers from the Quayle, Morris, Parker and Moak campaigns. One of the most startling revelations was Quayle's involvement in a Scottsdale night-life gossip website.

With no primary opposition, Hulburd's campaign focused on community involvement by partnering with community service organizations to work on helping those in need during this tough economic time. These include Vista Colina Emergency Shelter, Keep Phoenix Beautiful and the Phoenix Children's Hospital.

Hulburd won the Democratic primary with on August 24, 2010.

The DCCC has named the race in this district as one of its top 17 races to watch nationwide.
Following the election local political pundits have predicted that Jon Hulburd is in a favorable position to defeat the Republican candidate, Ben Quayle. The national media has begun to closely follow the race and Jon Hulburd made an appearance on On the Record w/ Greta Van Susteren.

The most recent Public Policy Polling (PPP) poll has him leading Quayle by two points 46-44. He leads among independent voters by a margin of 50 to 36 percent and leads with voters who consider themselves moderate by a 66 to 27 margin.

Electoral history 
{| class="wikitable" style="margin:0.5em ; font-size:95%"
|+ : 2010 primary election results
!|Year
!
!|Democrat
!|Votes
!|Pct
|-
|2010
|
| |Jon Hulburd
| align="right" |27,388
| |98.68%

Personal life
Hulburd and his college sweetheart, Carrie Louis, were married in 1984. They have five children.

Hulburd is an active member of his community, serving on the Board of Directors for both the Phoenix Children's Hospital and the New Way Learning Academy, a school focused on children with learning differences. He has supported several different social causes, including the Golden Gate Community Center in Phoenix, All Saints' Episcopal Day School, and the Phoenix Thunderbirds.
Hulburd began coaching youth soccer teams at the age of 20, and continued to do so for the next 30 years.

References

External links
Hulburd for Congress official campaign site
 
Campaign contributions at OpenSecrets.org

Living people
1959 births
Arizona Democrats
Lawyers from Phoenix, Arizona
Businesspeople from Phoenix, Arizona